The Nucle Saga I is a 2012 fantasy-fiction novel written by Saudi-born Indian author, Saif Ur Rahman. It was released in Hyderabad, India and in 2013 was honoured and awarded by Tanzeem Hum Hindustani, a NRI group based in Riyadh. Kingdom of Saudi Arabia. The novel was internationally published as an eBook via Amazon Kindle and later in the form of paperback. The novel serves as the first part in the upcoming series. The story is about four teenagers embarking on a journey against an Empire.

On 2 August 2018 the author launched his second novel: The Nucle Saga II alongside the chief guest Mr A.K.Khan, and guests of honour Mr Zahid Ali Khan and Mr Mohammed Hyder Ali at Media Plus Communication Auditorium, Hyderabad.

Synopsis

Plot 
The story is based on the events in a fictitious world centered around the "Mainlands". A merciless Emperor has risen from the west and laid siege of a sizable portion of the Mainlands. His gigantic Empire (known as the Axal Empire) threatens peace and courts destruction to the surrounding kingdoms. To repel the Emperor's invading attack, the remaining eastern kingdoms of the Mainland unite and form an alliance. A resistance leader, Eroberer meets two boys Zindor and Rador who pledge to contribute. Eroberer sends them on a mission to acquire a set of magical objects. Joined by a Gladanian town girl: Rohya and Eroberer's little sister: Esha, they are escorted by a man they meet on their journey called Nebu. The five travel together to pursue a powerful legend and collect objects.

Theme 
The author asserts that it's the traditional good vs. evil theme all over his book. According to him, some parts of the book are symbolic in nature.

Characters 
Emperor: Grimoran or the Dark Emperor, a young and merciless ruler who has conquered majority of the Mainlands. Eastern kingdoms have formed an alliance against him.

Eroberer: Often referred as "Commander" by his soldiers, the Burean Prince and has led the resistance against the Axal Empire. His group known as "Sovereigners" are an elite group of soldiers loyal to King Actium (his father) and conduct covert operations.

Zindor: A teenage boy who decides to embark on a mission.

Rador: Zindor's twin brother who shares a strong bond with him.

Rohya: A Gladanian town girl from Sohm.

Esha: The Burean Princess, known for her fierce sword fighting.

Nebu: A man, the four meet on their journey who becomes their teacher and leader.

About the author
Born in Riyadh, Saif hails from the city of Hyderabad, India. He studied from International Indian Public School, Riyadh (I.I.P.S.R) & graduated from Muffakham Jah College of Engineering & Technology. Fascination for fiction and fantasy compelled him to work upon a narrative storyline called: "The Nucle Saga" which will be followed by its sequels. An ardent reader at young age, while reading A Tale of Two Cities by Charles Dickens, he stumbled upon an idea to try his hands in writing. It took almost seven years to materialize his dream of writing the first book.

References

2012 Indian novels
Young adult fantasy novels
Indian fantasy novels